Honghu is a county-level city in the municipal region of Jingzhou, in the south of Hubei province. The city lies on the northwest (left) bank of the Yangtze River, across from Hunan Province and Xianning, Hubei. It is named after the adjacent Hong Lake, which since ancient times has periodically flooded.

The traditional Chinese holiday, Dragon Boat Festival, celebrated on the fifth day of the fifth lunar month, features boat races which are run on Hong Lake.

By means of its famous lake, Honghu City produces forty kinds of fish and an abundance of plants, such as lotus, reed and a type of black algae.

As of 2000, Honghu City had a  population of 335,618 or more people.

History
Honghu is celebrated as an important supporter of the Communist side during last century's Chinese Civil War. Westerners know it for New Zealand communist Rewi Alley's relief work and Gung-ho (共合, Gonghe) co-operative movement.

Civil War

Honghu and other regions around its lake were part of an important communist stronghold called the Hunan-Western Hubei Revolutionary Base Area (Xiang-Exi Geming Genjudi, also called the Hunan-Western Hubei Soviet, Xiang-Exi Suweiai). The Hunan-Western Hubei Soviet was actually a collection of several isolated bases linked together by underground and guerrilla activities. The Honghu Base, the largest, was itself the object of four Encirclement Campaigns, the last of which was strategised as one stage of the broadly successful Encirclement Campaign against Hunan-Western Hubei Soviet.

The base area or soviet was under the leadership of communist general (later Field Marshal) He Long through most of its existence, and defended by his Second Army Group. Finally crushed by Chiang Kai-shek's Chinese Army and various allied warlord forces, co-ordinated in his Encirclement Campaigns, the Soviet and its military force retreated westward to form the Hunan-Hubei-Sichuan-Guizhou revolutionary base area, which in October 1934 refuged the retreating troops of the Sixth Army Group. Folding the men of the Sixth into his ranks, He Long formed the Second Front Red Army which was to take its own route on the Long March.

Gung Ho

Rewi Alley carried out flood relief in Honghu 1932. Famous for the Gung Ho Cooperative movement that he founded (along with others) during the Second Sino-Japanese War (World War Two), Alley established half a dozen small-scale industrial co-operatives in Honghu under the revamped Gung Ho movement he led in the 1980s.

PRC

Market Economy in the 1950s
In 1954, Yangtze River had a huge flood that only occurred once a century, and in order to save major cities including Wuhan, Honghu was designated as the flooded area, resulting in nearly a million local residents becoming refugees after the entire county was flooded.  As the flood subsided and refugees returned to begin rebuilding, another political disaster struck the county that was already devastated by the flood: on May 5, 1955, Mao Zedong personally claimed that the time was critical for collectivization, and ordered the immediate start of collectivization, which must be completed within three years.

The local communist party secretary Mr. Li Jinyu(1922 - October 8, 2002) was assigned to the area in 1955 and witnessed the devastation first hand. Li strongly opposed Mao's  policy and openly claimed that there must be prerequisite conditions for collectivization and Honghu had not met any of them. Instead Li convinced his colleagues to adopt an economic policy that was completely against Mao's wish - a de facto market economy (for political reasons the term could not be mentioned).

This proved to be a great success: not only the county was fully recovered from the devastation within a year, the average industrial annual growth was 17.7% and average agricultural annual growth was 11.3%. In the era where most Chinese peasants were only able to eat meat once a year during the Chinese new year, the local peasantry students at all schools in Honghu county were guaranteed a meal of chicken, a meal of fish, and a meal of meat every week.  However, the good times would not last long: Li and his colleagues as well as the local population would eventually pay a heavy price for going against Mao's will. Li, keenly aware of this, asked the local populace to prepare by stocking grains and other foods at their homes.

The Great Leap Forward

In accordance with Mao's Great Leap Forward, the communist party apparatus at prefecture level issued orders on July 4, 1958, to produce forty thousand tons of steel, thirty-six thousand tons of iron, and over half a million people were mobilized for this effort.  Another three thousand were mobilized to logging in order to meet the fuel demand of making steel and iron.  Honghu, a county belong to the prefecture could be no exception and Mr. Li Jinyu's own son, Mr. Li Shutang, a student at the time, was among those mobilized.  After witnessing the furnace hastily built at his son's school, which was completely useless but still functioned due to the political reason, Mr. Li Jinyu only muttered one sentence: "This is a joke!", but he and his colleagues were powerless to stop the foolish policy that was issued by the Chinese paramount leader Mao Zedong.  Once his son Li Shutang excitedly told him that there average yield of a single hactre of rice reached 100 tons, Mr. Li Jinyu angrily shut his son up by telling the truth: that was the total production of twenty hactres of rice put into one, the propaganda had lied.

The consequence of Mao's distratrous policy soon appeared: since June 1959, according to official records of the Chinese government, the death of local prefecture numbered 115,844 in 1960, which was more than the double of the average annual death of 50,000. The price at Honghu county skyrocketed and the number of people becoming ill due to starvation drastically increased.  Mr. Li Jinyu and his colleague decided to save the local population totaling more than half a million from starvation, which ultimately would doom their fates.

The Great Chinese Famine
Massive death in the local Jingzhou prefecture forced the local cadres at prefecture level to gather as much grains as possible, and Honghu county, the only county in the prefecture without death caused by starvation, became their only target.  The local communist party secretary of Jingzhou prefecture, Xue Tan, asked Li Jinyu to leave only  of grains of monthly rations for each resident of Honghu, and give out the rest.

Li refused, arguing that it would at least take  of monthly ration to prevent death resulting from starvation.  After much argument without any satisfactory result, Li decided to go against his superior's order and allow the local populace to have enough to eat.  As a result, in an era when all other counties suffered tens of thousands of starvation deaths, Honghu county did not lose a single person to starvation, and the local population of Honghu county actually increased by 15.52‰ (or 1.552%).

Honghu county during Cultural Revolution
Mr. Li Jinyu and his colleagues soon paid their price for saving the local population.  Even before the Cultural Revolution, the local cadres were persecuted.  In October 1964, the communist apparatus at the Jingzhou prefecture level decided that the communist organization of Honghu county was completely "rotten" and Mr. Li Jinyu and his colleagues were struggled in public trials in front of ten thousand people.  In April 1965, the charge became much more serious, the local communists of Honghu county headed by Mr. Li Jinyu was accused of (though accurately) being reestablishing capitalism.  In February 1966, the local communists of Honghu county were accused of establishing independent kingdoms, forming reactionary anti-communism revisionist group, a serious political crime that was punishable by death.  Finally, in 1966, a total of 341 cadres of Honghu county, or 90% of the county administrators and local communists in charge, including communist party secretary Mr. Li Jinyu, first deputy communist party secretary Mr. Xu Wei, deputy communist party secretaries Han Yaohui, Ma Xiangkui, Gu Chengqi (辜呈清, also serving as Honghu County chief at the time) and Sun Keti (孙克惕, also serving as the deputy Honghu County chief at the time) were all arrested and sent directly to labor camps without trials or any other legal proceedings, and everyone received at least ten years jail terms, with Mr. Li Jinyu had the longest, a fifteen-year term.  The persecution had such devastation on those suffered that many, including the former deputy communist party secretary Mr. Xu Wei refused to be interviewed about the experience, even in the 2000s (decade), more than three decades later.  The subject remains a taboo in official documents by the Chinese government until this day, but those local populace who survived the massive famine thanks to what Mr. Li Jinyu had done would remember him.  After Mr. Li Jinyu had died on October 8, 2002, many of those who had experienced the famine went to his funeral to honor him, including many who could not go but insisted on being carried to the funeral.

Administrative divisions
Two subdistricts:
Xindi Subdistrict, Binhu Subdistrict

Fourteen towns:
Luoshan, Wulin, Longkou, Yanwo, Xintan, Fengkou, Caoshi, Fuchang, Daijiachang, Qujiawan, Shakou, Wanquan, Chahe, Huangjiakou

The only township is Laowan Township

Three administrative zones:
Xiaogang, Datonghu, Dashahu

Climate

Revolutionary opera

The scenic Lake Honghu was the centerpiece of a revolutionary opera: "The Red Guards on Honghu Lake" which was based on a true story about the Red Army and its struggle with the Kuomintang (KMT) in the Chinese Civil War.

A synopsis of this story which happened on Lake Honghu:

Noteworthy people born in Honghu 
Tian Qiyu, Vice-Minister of Public Security; born in 1940

Notes

Further reading 
 "Numerical simulations of nutrient transport changes in Honghu Lake Basin", Earth & Climate, Wednesday, August 20, 2008
 Jiaqi Yan, Kao Kao, Gao Gao, Danny Wynn Ye Kwok (Translator), "Turbulent Decade: A History of the Cultural Revolution", University of Hawaii Press, 1996. . Cf. pp. 203, 546, 626.
 Han Zao Li, "The Water Lily Pond: A Village Girl's Journey in Maoist China", Wilfrid Laurier University Press, 2004. . Cf. p. 106.
 Mackerras, Colin, "The Performing Arts in Contemporary China", Routledge, 2004. . Cf. p. 109 on the Red Guards of Honghu Lake opera.
 Ye Sang, Sang Ye, Geremie Barmé, Miriam Lang, "China Candid: The People on the People's Republic", University of California Press, 2006. . Cf. p. 29 on Honghu.

External links 
The Chinanet network in Jingzhou, Hubei province.

 
Cities in Hubei
County-level divisions of Hubei
Jingzhou